Bucculatrix ulmella is a moth of the family Bucculatricidae. It is found in most of Europe, except the Iberian Peninsula, Slovenia and Bulgaria. It was first described in 1848 by Philipp Christoph Zeller.

The wingspan is 7–8 mm. The head is ferruginous, sometimes mixed with dark fuscous in middle. Antennal eyecaps ochreous-whitish. Forewings ochreous-whitish, irrorated with brown; four oblique costal spots, first and third large, and a large median dorsal spot dark fuscous; cilia more ochreous tinged. Hindwings are grey. The larva is pale grey-greenish; lateral line darker; dots whitish; head pale brown; segment 2 brownish-grey, black-dotted.

Adults are on wing from May to June and again in August.

The larvae feed on Castanea sativa, Quercus faginea, Quercus petraea, Quercus pubescens, Quercus robur, Quercus rubra and Quercus trojana. They mine the leaves of their host plant. The mine has the form of a short, angular corridor with much black frass and a large larval chamber. The larvae leave the mine and engage in lower-surface window feeding. Larvae can be found in July and again from September to October. They are greenish grey mottled with white and with a light brown head.

Gallery

References

External links

Bucculatricidae
Leaf miners
Moths described in 1848
Moths of Europe
Taxa named by Philipp Christoph Zeller